Euso muehlenbergi is a species of spiders in the family Ochyroceratidae. It was first described in 1998 by Michael Saaristo. , it is the only species in the genus Euso, erected by Michael Saaristo in 2001. It is found in the Seychelles.

References

Ochyroceratidae
Spiders of Africa
Endemic fauna of Seychelles
Spiders described in 1998
Taxa named by Michael Saaristo